Chocolate Soldier was a chocolate-flavored beverage produced by the Monarch Beverage Company of Atlanta, Georgia. The drink was sold in glass bottles from 1966–1994. Chocolate Soldier was made by Citrus Products Company in Illinois in the 1950s and 1960s. It was bottled all over the United States.

It was also bottled in Mérida, Yucatán, Mexico, under the name "Soldado de Chocolate".

References

Chocolate drinks
Monarch brands